Dewaitha  is a village in Dildarnagar Kamsar, Ghazipur, India, on the banks of the Karmanasa River. The village had a population of 7,706 as of the 2011 Census of India and a land area of 1,043 acres. Most of the people living in the village are Kamsar Pathan.

History
Dewaitha village was established by Raja Sarkar Diwan Daud Khan a descendents of Narhar Khan in year 1605 who was great grand son of Narhar Khan. His descendents are known as Kamsar Pathans. His cousin was Raja Sarkar Diwan Kuttul Khan who established a large Jagir estate name as Kamsar Jagir and build a fort at Seorai during later years of Akbar's rule, his jagir was spread over 52 villages. But later he was killed in a fight with a zamindar of Reotipur name as Man singh rai. Daud Khan after taking revenge of his cousin's death became noble man of his time and was a big zamindar of the region and establish Daudpur estate after his name. It was a big estate which had many villages with its capital being Dewaitha. He also built a soldier setelment at Village name Daudpur (after his name) and a Fort at dewaitha which is converted into ruins. 

His legacy of Zamindarana and jagirdarana continued in his family with corporation. During the region of a Nawab Yad Ali Khan raies , sixth generation grandson gained a lot of power over this area and Daudpur region gained a lot of power. During Yad's region the Nawab of Ghazipur was, Fazal Ali Khan.(son of Sheikh Abdullah) the Ghazipur region gained a lot of power. Now Yad Ali's family is known a Atho Ghar. Its last lambardari and zamindari was headed by Wasil Khan, The family also had it's riayat and kot in the village. He was appointed as the caretaker of the village and after independence Wasil Khan also became the pradhan throughout his lifetime. Some parts of the Daudpur region was under Vizianagaram princely state during late British raj.

Demographics 
As of the 2011 Census of India, the total area of the village was 442.22 hectares. The village had a total population of 7,104 and 917 households.

References 

Cities and towns in Ghazipur district
Towns and villages in Kamsar
Villages in Ghazipur district